Leonardo Villar (25 July 1923 – 3 July 2020) was a Brazilian actor. He became internationally known for his performance as Zé do Burro in Anselmo Duarte's O Pagador de Promessas, the only Brazilian film so far awarded a Palme d'Or at the Cannes Film Festival.

Personal life
Leonardo Villar was born as Leonildo Motta in Piracicaba, São Paulo, on 25 July 1923.

Villar died on 3 July 2020 at a hospital in São Paulo, of cardiac arrest, aged 96.

Career
He started his career at the theater, but later also started acting in film and television.

Villar debuted at the theater on the 1950 play Os Pássaros. His first film role only came in 1962 as Zé do Burro in Anselmo Duarte's O Pagador de Promessas. He received international exposure for the role after the film won the Palme d'Or and became the first Brazilian and South American feature nominated for the Academy Award for Best Foreign Language Film. In 1965 he debuted on television in the TV Tupi telenovela A Cor de Sua Pele, which tells the story of an interracial relationship. In 1972, he moved to Rede Globo, where he starred in successful shows such as Escalada and Estúpido Cupido.

In 2001, after almost 20 years without acting in the theater, he starred in the play A Moratória. In 2007, after seven years without acting in a film, he starred in the critically acclaimed The Ballroom.

Filmography

Film
1962: O Pagador de Promessas .... Zé do Burro / Donkey Jack
1964: Lampião, o Rei do Cangaço .... Lampião
1964: Procura-se uma Rosa
1965: Samba .... (uncredited)
1965: A Hora e a Vez de Augusto Matraga .... Augusto Matraga
1966: A Grande Cidade .... Jasão
1966: Amor e Desamor
1966: O Santo Milagroso
1967: Juego peligroso .... Homero Olmos / Homero de Tal (segment "HO")
1967: O Santo Milagroso .... Pastor Raimundo
1968: A Madona de Cedro
1982: Amor de Perversão
1996: Enigma de um Dia (Short)
1998: Ação entre Amigos .... Correia
2000: Brava Gente Brasileira
2007: The Ballroom

TV work

1965: A Cor da Sua Pele .... Dudu
1967: Os Miseráveis .... Jean Valjean
1969: Acorrentados .... Rodrigo
1972: O Primeiro Amor .... Luciano
1972: Uma Rosa com Amor .... Frazão
1973: O Duelo (TV Movie)
1973-1974: Os Ossos do Barão .... Miguel
1974: O Crime de Zé Bigorna (TV Movie) .... Miguel Fará
1975: Escalada .... Alberto Silveira
1975: O Grito .... Edgar
1976-1977: Estúpido Cupido .... Guima
1980: Coração Alado .... França
1981: O fiel e a pedra
1982: O Homem Proibido .... Dario
1983-1984: Voltei pra Você .... Rubens
1984: Marquesa de Santos .... José Bonifácio de Andrada e Silva
1984: Santa Marta Fabril S.A.
1985: Tudo em Cima .... Robert Kraus
1986-1987: Mania de Querer .... João
1990: Desejo .... Rodrigues
1990: Barriga de Aluguel .... seu Ezequiel Ribeiro
1991-1992: Amazônia .... Peçanha (Rede Manchete)
1995: Tocaia Grande .... coronel Elias Daltro
1997: O desafio de Elias .... Malaquias
1997: Os Ossos do Barão .... Antenor
1998: Serras Azuis .... Ignácio O'Neill
2000: Laços de Família .... Pascoal
2002: Coração de Estudante .... Ronaldo Rosa
2006-2007: Pé na Jaca .... tio José Fortuna
2010-2011: Passione .... Antero / Giovani (final appearance)

Theater work

1950 - Os Pássaros1951 - La Dame aux camélias1951 - Six Characters in Search of an Author1952 - Antigone1952 - Vá com Deus1953 - A Falecida1953 - A Raposa e as Uvas1953 - Canção Dentro do Pão1954 - A Filha de Iório1954 - Leonor de Mendonça1955 - Maria Stuart1955 - Os Filhos de Eduardo1955 - Santa Marta Fabril S. A.1955 - Volpone1956 - Eurydice1956 - Cat on a Hot Tin Roof1956 - Divórcio para Três1957 - A Rainha e os Rebeldes1957 - Adorável Júlia1957 - As Provas de Amor 
1957 - Leonor de Mendonça1958 - A Muito Curiosa História da Virtuosa Matrona de Éfeso1958 - Panorama Visto da Ponte1958 - Pedreira das Almas1960 - O Pagador de Promessas1960 - O Anjo de Pedra1960 - Um Gosto de Mel1960 - Um Panorama Visto da Ponte1961 - A Semente1962 - Death of a Salesman1964 - Mary, Mary1966 - O Sistema Fabrizzi1966 - Rasto Atrás1967 - Lua Minguante na Rua 141971 - Miss Julie1972 - Um Panorama Visto da Ponte1977 - A Mala1978 - O Grande Amor de Nossas Vidas1979 - Investigação na Classe Dominante1980 - Campeões do Mundo1982 - Motel Paradiso2001 - A Moratória''

References

External links

family tree on WikiTree

1923 births
2020 deaths
20th-century Brazilian male actors
21st-century Brazilian male actors
Brazilian male film actors
Brazilian male stage actors
Brazilian male telenovela actors
Brazilian people of Spanish descent
People from Piracicaba